The discography of British art pop/new wave band Japan, including their reformation as Rain Tree Crow, consists of 6 studio albums, 17 compilations albums, 1 live album, and 4 video releases.

Albums

Studio albums 

Notes

Live albums

Compilation albums

Box sets

Repackaged sets

EPs and mini-albums

Singles

Videos

Video albums

Music videos

See also
David Sylvian discography

References 

Discographies of British artists
Pop music group discographies
Rock music group discographies
New wave discographies